The  is a park-like Japanese Imperial Estate, site of several major existing and former Imperial residences in the district of Moto-Akasaka, Minato Special Ward, Tokyo. Besides Prince Hitachi, who lives in Higashi, Shibuya, and the Emperor Emeritus, who lives in Takanawa Residence until April 2022, many members of the Imperial Family have their official residence on this estate, currently (July 2020) including the Emperor himself. The estate is not accessible to the general public.

Overview 
Six residences are currently located on the grounds of the estate.

There are six main access gates.

History 
In 1823, a fire destroyed the main residence of the clan in Kojimachi, turning that spare into their main Edo residence. At the Meiji restoration, the head of the clan, Tokugawa Mochitsugu, became a Kazoku noble and lived in the estate. In 1873, a fire broke down and destroyed the Nishinomaru palace of the Edo castle, where the Emperor was staying. Mochitsugu opened on the very day his  of the estate to the Emperor, who lived there for 15 years. Another residence on the southwest of the estate was given to Empress Dowager Eishō, as the Emperor wanted to have her close.

After that point, the grounds of the estate have been used to build several residences and palaces, be it for crown-princes, Empresses dowager, or close family members.

On the North side of the estate, where the site of the initial Akasaka residence was, a Tōgū palace was built in 1909 and became the Geihinkan. After the second world war, the Geihinkan was split from the estate and became National property, whereas the remaining estate remains Imperial property.

Current residences of the estate 
There are currently 6 imperial residences on the estate, in clockwise order:

Akasaka Palace 

The , formerly Tōgū Palace, is the current (July 2020) residence of the Emperor, the Empress and Princess Aiko, until they move to the Fukiage Palace of the Imperial Palace. The palace is located on the northern side of the estate. The 2 floor reinforced concrete building was built in 1960 on a design by Yoshirō Taniguchi. The palace has 72 rooms.

Akasaka East Palace 
Located roughly 200m to the south of the Yushintei (the Japanese style annex of the Geihinkan) The  was achieved in 1984 and is mainly used as a temporary residence for Imperial family members during works. Late prince Takamado used it while his own residence was being built. It was refurbished in 1989 by adding offices and dependencies and was used as a temporary palace for Naruhito several times. There are plans to include this palace in the nearby Akishino residence.

Akishino Residence
The  is located on the south-eastern side of the estate. The residential complex is an aggregation of several former imperial residences and buildings renovated over the years: the Chichibu Residence first built in 1972, a housing for dry nurses of the Ministry of the Imperial Household built in 1931 (where Kazuko Takatsukasa, daughter of Emperor Showa lived from 1968 to 1989) and an expansion built in 2000, further expanded for the birth of Hisahito. Prince Akishino moved in 1990.

Since 2019, the complex is being refurbished and renovated, works will last until 2022. The family lives a few meters to the East in a temporary palace built on purpose, called .

Currently Prince Akishino, his consort Kiko, their two daughters Princess Kako and Princess Mako, and their son Prince Hisahito live in this residence.

East Residence of Mikasa 
The  is located southwest of the Akishino residence. This 2 floor building was achieved in 1982 as a residence for late Prince Tomohito, who died in 2012. This 2 floor building has 15 rooms, not taking into account the handmaid dependencies. At the time of the Prince's death, Princess Nobuko was living separately from her consort since 2009, leaving the residence to their two daughters, princess Akiko and princess Yoko. When the prince died, the Mikasa imperial lineage was merged and the building renamed East residence of Mikasa.

Residence of Mikasa 
Located south of the estate, the  has been in use since 1970 by late Prince Mikasa and consort, Princess Yuriko.

Takamado Residence
The  is on the south side of the estate, next to the Residence of Mikasa. It was finished in 1986 as a residence for late Prince Takamado. The residence is a 2-floor Art Deco hipped roof reinforced-concrete building. It has 19 rooms (including offices and handmaid dependencies) and a garden with a pergola. Two of Prince Takamado daughters (Noriko Senge and Ayako Moriya) have left the Imperial family after their marriage to commoners, leaving the widow Princess Hisako, and one daughter, Princess Tsuguko, as remaining members of the branch in the Imperial family.

References 

Districts of Minato, Tokyo
Parks and gardens in Tokyo